Mark Allen Olberding (born April 21, 1956) is an American former professional basketball player born in Melrose, Minnesota.

A 6'8" forward from the University of Minnesota, Olberding played 12 seasons (1975–1987) in the American Basketball Association and National Basketball Association as a member of the San Diego Sails (1975–76), San Antonio Spurs (1975–82), Chicago Bulls (1982–83) and Kansas City/Sacramento Kings (1983–87). He had his best seasons with the Spurs, for whom he played 536 games. One of the highlights of his career occurred on January 21, 1977, when he made 10 field goals without missing in a game against the Boston Celtics.  In the 1987–88 season, he played professionally in Italy for Benetton Treviso.

During the 1980s, Spurs teammates Olberding, George Johnson, Dave Corzine, Kevin Restani, Paul Griffin, and Reggie Johnson earned the nickname "The Bruise Brothers" for their physical style of play.

Olberding currently lives in San Antonio.

References

External links
Career stats at Basketball Reference

1956 births
Living people
American expatriate basketball people in Italy
American men's basketball players
Basketball players from Minnesota
Chicago Bulls players
Kansas City Kings players
Minnesota Golden Gophers men's basketball players
Pallacanestro Treviso players
Parade High School All-Americans (boys' basketball)
People from Melrose, Minnesota
Power forwards (basketball)
Sacramento Kings players
San Antonio Spurs players
San Diego Sails players
Small forwards
Undrafted National Basketball Association players